Highway 56 in the U.S. state of Montana is a route running in a northerly direction from an intersection with Montana Highway 200 between Noxon and Heron at an area locally known as "Bull River Junction", about  east of the Idaho state line. The highway passes through a forested, mountainous landscape, and travels along the eastern shore of Bull Lake; the Cabinet Mountains are to the east. The entire route is within the boundary of the Kootenai National Forest. Highway 56 is known locally as the "Bull Lake Road" and "Bull River Highway".

History 
Before receiving its current designation in 1978, Highway 56 was designated as Montana Secondary Highway 202. The valley is a rarity in that  drainage occurs in opposite directions, as Bull River runs south to the Clark Fork River and Bull Lake drains into Lake Creek, which continues north into the Kootenai River.

Major intersections

References

External links

056